Donald Hutchins (born 8 May 1948) is an English retired footballer who played for Leicester City, Plymouth Argyle, Blackburn Rovers, Bradford City and Scarborough

External links
Bradford City profile
Boy From Brazil profile
bantamspast profile

1948 births
Living people
English footballers
Association football forwards
Leicester City F.C. players
Blackburn Rovers F.C. players
Plymouth Argyle F.C. players
Bradford City A.F.C. players
Scarborough F.C. players
English Football League players